Standardization or standardisation is the process of implementing and developing technical standards.

The term also has other senses:

 Standard score, in statistics, the number of standard deviations by which an observation differs from the mean
 Standard language, a language variety whose grammar and usage are codified
  Standardization of population numbers in demographics
 Standardization agreement, defining processes, procedures, terms, and conditions for common military or technical procedures or equipment between the member countries of the NATO alliance